Fabián Muñoz (born 3 November 1991) is an Argentine football winger.

Career

Club career
Muñoz made his professional debut in the Argentine Primera División with Newell's Old Boys in 2011. On 30 January 2016, Muñoz signed an 18-month contract with Panetolikos.

On 12 July 2019 Muñoz joined Cypriot club Alki Oroklini. He left the club at the end of January 2020, to join Albanian club KF Bylis Ballsh on a deal until 31 May 2020. He left the club when his contract expired.

References

External links
 

1991 births
Living people
Argentine footballers
Argentine expatriate footballers
Newell's Old Boys footballers
Arsenal de Sarandí footballers
Club Atlético Temperley footballers
Gimnasia y Esgrima de Jujuy footballers
Panetolikos F.C. players
Alki Oroklini players
KF Bylis Ballsh players
Argentine Primera División players
Primera Nacional players
Super League Greece players
Kategoria Superiore players
Cypriot Second Division players
Argentine expatriate sportspeople in Greece
Expatriate footballers in Greece
Argentine expatriate sportspeople in Cyprus
Expatriate footballers in Cyprus
Argentine expatriate sportspeople in Albania
Expatriate footballers in Albania
Association football wingers
Sportspeople from Santa Fe Province